Nikolai Chernov (November 10, 1956 – August 7, 2014)
was a Ukrainian-American mathematician.
Since 1994, he worked at University of Alabama at Birmingham. 
In 2012, he became a Fellow of the American Mathematical Society.

References

Living people
Fellows of the American Mathematical Society
20th-century American mathematicians
University of Alabama faculty
Moscow State University alumni
1956 births
21st-century American mathematicians